Point Breeze was an estate in Bordentown, New Jersey. It was the home of Joseph Bonaparte, the brother of Napoleon Bonaparte, from 1816 to 1839.

Bonaparte estate

Grounds

In 1816, after he had fled Europe following the defeat of his brother at Waterloo, Joseph Bonaparte bought the property and the land from American diplomat Stephen Sayre (1736–1818). The estate was located on a promontory which overlooked Crosswicks Creek and the Delaware River. 

Bonaparte then set about making the estate the center of society on the East coast. Numerous members of high society, politicians, overseas dignities visited what became known as Bonaparte's Park. Soon it became famous for its landscape, gardens, extensive art collection with more than 150 paintings by Flemish and Italian masters, and 8,000 volume library, which was one of the largest libraries in the United States at that time. 

Bonaparte had the original painting of his brother, Napoleon Crossing the Alps by Jacques-Louis David, prominently displayed in the house.

Mansions
On January 4, 1820, Bonaparte's first mansion burned down. Many of the furnishings and books from the house were saved by neighbors and servants who ran into the building while it was ablaze.

Following the fire, Bonaparte had a new mansion built. It was larger than the first, with the existing stables enlarged, further back from the overlook of the river. Construction was supervised by French émigré Michel Bouvier. On completion, it was generally viewed - perhaps diplomatically - as the “second-finest house in America” after the White House.

In 1839 Joseph Bonaparte returned to Europe for good. He never returned to Breeze Point. When he died in Florence, Italy in 1844, Point Breeze was inherited by his grandson Joseph Lucien Bonaparte, who sold the estate and most of its contents at auction three years later. The Philadelphia Museum of Art and the Pennsylvania Academy of Fine Arts later acquired a significant amount of furnishings and paintings from the house.

Further ownership
By 1850, Point Breeze was owned by Hamilton Beckett, the son of Henry Beckett, the British consul in Philadelphia. After moving into the gatehouse, he had the main house torn down. A third mansion was built on the site which survived until 1983 when it was lost to a fire. 

In 1874, the Vincentian Fathers of Philadelphia purchased Point Breeze for use as a summer retreat. In 1911, they sold it to industrialist Harris Hammond. After the 1929 stock market crash, the house was repossessed by the bank and lay vacant for over ten years. 

In 1941, Divine Word Missionaries, a Roman Catholic missionary religious congregation, acquired the property. Divine Word used the property as a seminary and in later years as a retirement community.

Archaeological exploration
Since 2006, Richard Veit, a professor of archaeology at Monmouth University, has led several archaeological digs on the property. The digs have unearthed over 20,000 artifacts, including shards of ceramic tableware, glass, wine bottles, door hardware, and tapestry buttons. Many of the recovered artifacts are charred by the 1820 fire.

Preservation
The estate was added to the National Register of Historic Places on August 10, 1977, for its significance in architecture, landscape architecture, and politics/government. It includes five contributing buildings and two contributing sites. 

In 2020, the City of Bordentown and D&R Greenway Land Trust partnering with the New Jersey Department of Environmental Protection acquired the remaining 60 acres of the estate for $4.6 million from Divine Word Missionaries.  of the site became the new municipal complex for the city which opened in August 2022. The remaining land will remain as open space with walking trails.

Gallery

References

External links

Bordentown, New Jersey
National Register of Historic Places in Burlington County, New Jersey
Historic districts on the National Register of Historic Places in New Jersey
New Jersey Register of Historic Places
Houses in Burlington County, New Jersey